The June bug or June Bug Annihilator is a tropical cocktail. 

It consists of a mixture of  Midori melon liqueur as base liquor, with modifiers of coconut rum (such as Malibu), Banana liqueur,  pineapple juice, and sweet & sour. It is shaken with ice and served long, in a Collins glass, over ice with optional fruit garnish. It is a fresh tasting sweet and tropical drink, with a bright green color.

References

Cocktails with rum
Cocktails with liqueur
Cocktails with coconut
Cocktails with pineapple juice
Sour cocktails
Sweet cocktails
Cocktails with fruit liqueur
Tiki drinks